Juan Sancho de Tovar, 1st Marquis of Berlanga (in full) ( – ) was a Spanish nobleman.

Tovar was the second son of Íñigo Fernández de Velasco, 2nd Duke of Frías and of María de Tovar, Lady of Berlanga. His original name was Juan Sancho Fernández de Velasco y Tovar, but he changed it and adopted his mother's last name in order to succeed to her titles, as Lord of Berlanga. On 10 April 1529, he was raised to Marquis of Berlanga by Charles V, Holy Roman Emperor. He married María Girón, Lady of Gandul and Marchenilla, with whom he had 8 children.

Íñigo Fernández de Velasco, 4th Duke of Frías
Francisco de Velasco y Tovar
Pedro de Velasco y Tovar
Juan de Velasco y Tovar
Inés de Velasco y Tovar, who married Jerónimo de Acevedo, 4th Count of Monterrey
Isabel de Velasco y Tovar, who married Antonio Gómez de Mendoza, 5th Count of Castrogeriz
Juliana de Velasco y Tovar, nun
Bernardina de Velasco y Tovar, nun

After the death of his first wife, he married Juana Enríquez, sister of Perafán de Ribera, 1st Duke of Alcalá. They had no issue. Tovar died in 1540.

Sources

Bibliography 

1490 births
1540 deaths
01
Juan